Student Brands (formerly StudyMode) is a Los Angeles County-based company that owned and operated a network of educational websites and applications.

StudyMode’s network of properties includes StudyMode.com, where students can download model essays and term papers, book notes and AP notes; Cram.com, where students can share and review flashcards; and Cite.com, a citation generator and bibliography builder.  The company also owns several international properties including BuenasTareas.com, a Spanish-language version of StudyMode.com, Etudier.com, the French version, and TrabalhosFeitos.com, the Portuguese version of StudyMode.com.

StudyMode was founded by Blaine Vess and Chris Nelson in 1999 and was originally run out of a dorm room at North Central College. By 2007, revenues and profits exceeded . Todd Clemens joined the company in 2008. The company subsequently grew through acquisitions and international site launches. Its portfolio now includes more than a dozen websites in several languages and reaches about 2.5 million visitors per day. Annual revenues exceed $10 million.

For more than a decade, the co-founders ran the company out of Vess’ home with about thirty remote contractors.  In 2011, the company moved into a physical office in West Hollywood. In 2015, the company moved again to the Taft Building in Hollywood and then moved once again to its current location in the PacMutual building in Downtown Los Angeles. It now has over 60 employees.

Acquisition
StudyMode was consolidated into Student Brands in January 2017, which in turn was acquired by Barnes & Noble Education in August 2017.

References

Publishing companies established in 1999
1999 establishments in California
Companies based in West Hollywood, California